Carex specifica is a species of sedge known by the common name narrowfruit sedge.

Description
Carex specifica produces dense clumps of stems up to about 85 centimeters in maximum height. The inflorescence is a dense green to gold cluster of flower spikes up to 5 centimeters long. The fruit is enclosed in a very narrow, pointed green to straw colored perigynium.

External links
Jepson Manual Treatment - Carex specifica
Flora of North America
Carex specifica - Photo gallery

specifica
Flora of California
Flora of Nevada
Flora of the Cascade Range
Flora of the Klamath Mountains
Flora of the Sierra Nevada (United States)
Plants described in 1889
Flora without expected TNC conservation status
Taxa named by Liberty Hyde Bailey